"Teach Your Children" is a song written by Graham Nash in 1968 when he was a member of the Hollies. Although it was never recorded by that group in a studio, the Hollies did record it live in 1983. After the song was initially recorded for the album Crosby, Stills & Nash in 1969, a much more enhanced version of the song was recorded for the album Déjà Vu by Crosby, Stills, Nash & Young, released in 1970. As a single, the song peaked at No. 16 on the Billboard Hot 100 charts that year.  On the Easy Listening chart, it peaked at No. 28.  In Canada, "Teach Your Children" reached No. 8. Reviewing the song, Cash Box commented on the "incredible soft harmony luster" and "delicately composed material." Stephen Stills gave the song its "country swing", replacing the "Henry VIII" style of Nash's original demo.

Nash, who is also an accomplished photographer and collector of photographs, associated the song's message with a famous 1962 photo by Diane Arbus, Child with Toy Hand Grenade in Central Park, shortly after writing his song. The image, which depicts a child with an angry expression holding the toy weapon, prompted Nash to reflect on the societal implications of messages given to children about war and other issues.

The recording features Jerry Garcia on pedal steel guitar. Garcia taught himself how to play the instrument during his tenure with the New Riders of the Purple Sage. He told Lon Goddard of the British music newspaper Record Mirror in an interview that he recorded a series of pieces on the steel guitar and spliced them together in the studio to create the backing and solo. Garcia had made a deal that in return for his playing steel guitar on "Teach Your Children," CSNY would help members of the Grateful Dead improve their vocal harmony for their upcoming albums, Workingman's Dead and American Beauty.

Personnel
David Crosby – harmony vocals
Stephen Stills – harmony vocals, guitars, bass
Graham Nash – lead vocal, harmony vocals, rhythm guitar, percussion
Dallas Taylor – drums, tambourine, percussion
Jerry Garcia – pedal steel guitar

Chart history

Weekly charts (1970)

Year-end charts (1970)

"The Red Hots" (1994)
In 1994, Crosby, Stills & Nash re-recorded the song with guest vocals from country music artists Suzy Bogguss, Alison Krauss and Kathy Mattea, crediting the recording to "The Red Hots". This version was included on the album Red Hot + Country, a release by the Red Hot Organization benefiting AIDS awareness. The Red Hots' version of the song spent one week on the Hot Country Songs chart in October 1994, at No. 75.

In popular culture
In 1971, "Teach Your Children" was the final song in the movie Melody.
In 1979, the song was featured in the WKRP in Cincinnati episode "I Want to Keep My Baby".
In 1984, Democratic candidate Walter Mondale used the song in a presidential campaign commercial on arms control.
In 1985, the song was used with modified lyrics in a TV commercial promoting schools' use of the Apple II family of personal computers.
In 1991, the song was featured in The Wonder Years episode "Road Trip".
In 2006, it was sung by Steve Carell and Rainn Wilson on The Office episode "Take Your Daughter to Work Day".
In 2015, the song was covered by Matthew Morrison during the series finale episode of Glee, "Dreams Come True".
In 2018, the song was used frequently in The X-Files episode "Rm9sbG93ZXJz".

References

External links
 

1970 singles
Crosby, Stills, Nash & Young songs
Folk rock songs
Songs written by Graham Nash
1970 songs
Atlantic Records singles
Songs about educators